La Venganza de los Ex is a Mexican reality series that airs on MTV. The series premiered on August 21, 2018. It features eight single men and women enjoying a summer vacation in paradise as they search for love. However, their exes joined them to turn things around. Each ex was there for a painful revenge or to rekindle their love.

Regular series

Series 1 (2018) 

The first series of La Venganza de los Ex was announced by MTV Latin America in June 2018. It was confirmed that the show will take place in Tulum, Mexico. The official list of cast members was confirmed with a promotion and includes four guys singles: Oscar Plascencia, Ernesto Leal who appeared on the Mexican reality show Mitad y Mitad, Alejandro Martín, and Big Brother México star Luis Carlos Sánchez; as well as four single women: Renata Aragón, Norma Atúnez, Gina Segura and Monserrath Ávila. The show premiered on August 21, 2018. It was also confirmed that the cast members of Acapulco Shore, Brenda Zambrano and Gabriela Ruíz, as well as Dianey Sahagún, who participated in the second season of Are You the One? El Match Perfecto, will participate in the series as ex.

 Bold indicates original cast member; all other cast were brought into the series as an ex.

Duration of cast 

 Key:  = "Cast member" is featured in this episode
 Key:  = "Cast member" arrives on the beach
 Key:  = "Cast member" has an ex arrive on the beach
 Key:  = "Cast member" arrives on the beach and has an ex arrive during the same episode
 Key:  = "Cast member" leaves the beach
 Key:  = "Cast member" does not feature in this episode

La Venganza de los Ex VIP

Series 1 (2021) 

On September 12, 2021, MTV Latin America announced a new edition of the show, which was filmed in Colombia, is scheduled to premiere on 9 November 2021. This series is billed as "La Venganza de los Ex VIP" as, for the first time, it features a set of famous cast members. the official list of cast members was confirmed with a promotion and includes four five singles: Brandon Castañeda, Camilo Pulgarin, Esteban Martínez, Ian García, and Roberto Mor; as well as five single women: Aylin Criss, Daphne Monasterios, Frida Urbina, Kelly Medan and Kimberly Shantal.

Series 2 (2023) 

The second season of the VIP version of the program premiered on January 24, 2022. The season was announced in December 2022 along with the cast members including five men: Brandon Meza, Christian Renaud, Isaac Torres, Pedro Luis Figueira known as "La Divaza", Rafael Delgado known as "Rufas" and five women: Ana Cisneros, Diana Estrada, Leslie Gallardo, Lizbeth Rodríguez, and Yurgenis Aular.

Episodes

Series overview

Series 1 (2018)

Series 2 (2021)

Notes

References 

MTV original programming
2018 Mexican television series debuts
Mexican reality television series
Ex on the Beach
Television shows filmed in Mexico
Television shows filmed in Colombia